Greg Williams (born January 27, 1947) is an American retired basketball coach. He played college basketball for Rice before starting a 45-year coaching career.

He coached both incarnations of the Dallas Diamonds. In the 1980–81 season, the team went 27–9 and he was named Women's Professional Basketball League Coach of the Year. After coaching at Southern Methodist University, he was named head coach of the WABA Dallas Diamonds. With his leadership, the team posted a 19–2 record. The team was the league champion and Williams was named WABA Coach of the Year.

He is a 1970 graduate of Rice University and spent the final 10 seasons of his coaching career (2005–2015) as the Rice women's basketball head coach. He lettered in basketball for three years while playing for the Owls and was named all-Southwest Conference as well as league Co-MVP in 1969. He earned his degree in physical education and was immediately hired as assistant coach of the men's team. Under the leadership of Don Knodel, Williams helped the Owls win the 1970 SWC championship.

Williams retired at the end of the 2014–15 season with a 141–170 record at Rice and an overall head coaching record of 342–309. He had also served as women's head coach at Houston and Colorado State.

References

External links
Rice bio

1947 births
Living people
American men's basketball coaches
American men's basketball players
Basketball coaches from Indiana
Basketball players from Indiana
Colorado State Rams women's basketball coaches
Dayton Flyers women's basketball coaches
Detroit Shock head coaches
Guards (basketball)
Houston Cougars women's basketball coaches
People from Portland, Indiana
Rice Owls men's basketball coaches
Rice Owls men's basketball players
Rice Owls women's basketball coaches
SMU Mustangs women's basketball coaches
Utah Starzz coaches
Women's National Basketball Association general managers
Women's Professional Basketball League coaches